Barszczewo  is a village in the administrative district of Gmina Choroszcz, within Białystok County, Podlaskie Voivodeship, in north-eastern Poland.

References

Barszczewo
Grodno Governorate
Białystok Voivodeship (1919–1939)